Carl Olof "Olle" Hedberg (31 May 1899, Norrköping, Sweden – 20 September 1974, Verveln, Östergötland, Sweden) was a Swedish author.

Hedberg is known as a probing satirist of the middle class and conventional world in general. His first novel, Rymmare och fasttagare (Prisoner's base), was published in 1930, and from then on would write a novel every year for the next several decades. His works of the 1940s entail a search for religious and moral values. Bekänna färg (Show one’s hand), published in 1947, is considered to be one of his most important novels from this period.

His works do not aspire to a philosophical greatness.  Rather he himself is more of a realist and a disenchanted moralist. He was a member of the Swedish Academy from 1957.

Hedberg committed suicide 1974, a few weeks after his daughter Birgitta succumbed to a sudden illness.

Selected bibliography
Prisoner's Base (1930) (English translation 1932)
Iris och löjtnantshjärta (1934)
Ut med blondinerna! (1939)
Stopp! Tänk på något annat (1939)
Bekänna färg (1947)
Animals in Cages (1959) (English translation 1962)

Notes

1899 births
1974 suicides
People from Norrköping
Writers from Östergötland
Members of the Swedish Academy
Swedish male novelists
20th-century Swedish novelists
20th-century male writers
Suicides in Sweden